Zavirre Carcereri (12 April 1876 – 4 June 1951) was an Italian wrestler. He competed in the middleweight event at the 1912 Summer Olympics.

References

External links
 

1876 births
1951 deaths
Olympic wrestlers of Italy
Wrestlers at the 1912 Summer Olympics
Italian male sport wrestlers
Sportspeople from Verona